Ardpeaton is a settlement in Argyll and Bute, Scotland, on the shore of Loch Long, with a population under 1000.

References

Villages in Argyll and Bute